Anupama Prakash Kumar (born 4 December 1974) is an Indian actress and model. Having appeared in more than 300 commercials, she made her debut as an actress in the 2010 Hindi movie Ishqiya,followed by Cheran's Pokkisham in Tamil and Kicha Sudeepa's Paartha in Kannada. She went on to play supporting roles in mostly Tamil language films Tamil films. as well as in Hindi, English, Telugu and Kannada language movies. Besides acting and modelling, Anupama has also worked as a journalist, television anchor, and television producer. She recently turned Movie Producer with her indie black and white flick that is due for release in the summer of 2023 She won the Vijay Award 2013 for Best Actor in a Supporting Role (Female) for her role in Muppozhudhum Un Karpanaigal. Her recent release Sarpatta Parambarai, which has been critically acclaimed internationally, won her the Galatta Crown Award, a Filmfare Award nomination and the Norway Tamil Film Festival award for best actor in a Supporting Role as well.

Personal life 
She is married to G. Shivakumar, a Navy commander, and has one son, Aditya, with whom she currently resides in Chennai.

Career 
Born at Coimbatore, Tamil Nadu, Anupama mostly lived in North India. She had been mainly involved in the field of television for over thirteen years, working as an anchor, visualizer, journalist and even producer. Later she started off into a modelling and acting career, featuring in more than 300 commercials along with the likes of Shah Rukh Khan and Mohanlal. She had appeared in several Hindi language television series such as Kabhi Aaye Na Judaai, Mission Fateh, Shaka Laka Boom Boom and The Magic Make-Up Box as well. Kumar debuted in Indian films with the critically acclaimed 2010 film Ishqiya in a cameo.

Filmography

Television

References

External links 
 

21st-century Indian actresses
Actresses in Telugu cinema
Actresses in Tamil cinema
Female models from Tamil Nadu
Living people
1974 births
Indian film actresses
Actresses in Hindi cinema
Actresses in Hindi television
Indian television actresses
People from Coimbatore
Actresses from Tamil Nadu
Actresses in Malayalam cinema